Nathaniel Adisa Amos (born 26 October 1989 in Lagos) is a Nigerian professional footballer who last played for Sporting Clube de Goa in the I-League.

Career
Amos began his career with Crown FC and joined 2008 to Indian club SC Goa.

References

1989 births
Living people
Nigerian footballers
Nigerian expatriate footballers
Sporting Clube de Goa players
Expatriate footballers in India
Nigerian expatriate sportspeople in India
Sportspeople from Lagos
Association football forwards